The 1987–88 Magyar Kupa (English: Hungarian Cup) was the 48th season of Hungary's annual knock-out cup football competition.

Quarter-finals
Games were played on March 9 and March 23, 1988.

|}

Semi-finals
Games were played on April 13, May 24, 25 and June 10, 1988.

|}

Final

See also
 1987–88 Nemzeti Bajnokság I

References

External links
 Official site 
 soccerway.com

1987–88 in Hungarian football
1987–88 domestic association football cups
1987-88